Muthupettai is a town in the Thiruvarur district in the Indian state of Tamil Nadu. It is also known as Pearlpet. Muthupet comes under the Thiruthuraipoondi assembly constituency which elects a member to the Tamil Nadu Legislative Assembly every five years. The current member of the legislative assembly (MLA) is Marimuthu of the Communist Party of India, a part of the Nagapattinam (Lok Sabha constituency), which elects its member of parliament (MP) every five years. The Muthupet city in-town panchayat was constituted in 1962. The town comes under the administrative territory of the Thiruvarur District. It extends over an area of 12.80 km2.

Geography
Muthupet is a town in the Tiruvarur District. It is located between Thiruthuraipoondi and Pattukkotai, and around 360 km from Chennai. The town lies adjacent to the Bay of Bengal and is in the southernmost part of the Cauvery delta. Muthupet is bordered by the Korayar and Bamaniyar rivers to the east and west respectively. The rivers Koriayar and Pamaniyar join near Muthupet, where a lagoon lies that is rich in fish.

Muthupet is a prominent location for fishing, pearl hunting, and bird hunting. Fishing industries are also prominent and produce finfish (koduva), shrimp and crab. A natural mangrove forest, Alayathi Kadu, is one of the largest of its kind in India.

In the early hours of 16 November 2018, Muthupet was heavily affected by Cyclone Gaja. Wind speed reached up to 140-160 kmph in Muthupet, devastating hundreds of huts and thousands of trees. Many houses were destroyed during the cyclone. As a result of over 500 electric poles and over 20 transformers falling down, Muthupet did not regain its power supply until 20 days after Cyclone Gaja struck.

Mangroves and lagoons 

Muthupet mangrove forest is located at the southern end of the Cauvery delta, covering an area of approximately 13,500 ha of which only 4% is occupied by well-grown mangroves. The rivers Paminiyar, Koraiyar, Kilaithankiyar, Marakkakoraiyar and other tributaries of the river Cauvery flow through Muthupet and its adjacent villages. At the tail end, they form a lagoon before meeting the sea.

The northern and western borders of the lagoon are occupied by muddy silt ground which is devoid of mangroves. The mangroves beyond Muthupet Lagoon are discontinuously found along the shore and extend up to Point Calimere. Muthupet mangrove forest was under the control of Chatram Department from 1853 to 1912 (Chengappa, 1918). The government of the presidency of Madras Gazette (1937) shows that, from 1923 to 1936, half of the revenue obtained from selling mangrove products was paid to the revenue department and the remaining half was spent to maintain the "chatrams" (charity homes). The government declared the Muthupet mangrove forest as revenue forest in February 1937 and, accordingly, the mangrove forest was handed over to the forest department of the Madras presidency.

The forest is maintained by the Tamil Nadu Forest Department. The mangrove forest is divided into the Palanjur, Thamarankottai, Maravakkadu, Vadakadu, Thuraikadu and Muthupet reserve forests.

Muthupet reserve forest covers the lagoon, river creeks and the mudflats. Muthupet Lagoon (Mullipallam) is a natural lagoon that is 8 km from nearby Muthupet town and can only be reached by boat. The lagoon is shallow with an average depth of 1 m. The bottom of the lagoon is formed of silt clay substratum. The tidal fluctuations can be observed by the exposure of oyster beds and roots during low tide.

These tidal fluctuations play a major role in dispersing mangrove seeds. Dense mangroves mostly cover the lagoon shore. Islets are found on the western side and submerged during high tide. The salinity is a major environmental factor that controls zonation of Muthupet mangrove forest. Avicennia marina is the single dominant plant species.

The southern mudflat separates the lagoon from the adjacent sea, which creates a permanent lagoon mouth with seasonal shallow waterways. The width of the mudflat increases from the lagoon mouth to the east. The mudflat is dry in summer, but the presence of dead gastropods under the surface soil layer and the erosion of soil at the centre of the mudflat cause the submergence of the mudflat during floods. The distance of the mangroves from the fluctuating water level differs between the lagoon shore and seashore of the same mudflat. 

The mangroves have grown close to the water level at the lagoon side but not at the seashore. The reason may be the difference in the nature of fine clayey silt deposition that is carried by the rivers. The salt marshes are found under herb as well as lining the inner side of the forest. In the degraded central part of the mudflat, the soft fine silt is found only around the salt marshes. The remaining barren ground is hard clay, which may be due to the erosion of the surface silt by wind or floodwater. Thousands of partially decomposed rooted trunks found on the southeastern side of Muthupet lagoon are indications of past, indiscriminate exploitation. 

At 100–150 m in width and 5–6 km in length, the density of mangroves in the eastern side of Muthupet lagoon is comparatively lower than other areas. Tamil Nadu Forest Department has excavated several canals across the mudflat. Each main canal, which enhances the water movement between sea and lagoon, has several sub canals on either side with a substantial number of mangrove seedlings. The western side has a protruding land pocket that has formed an islet-like structure. This part of the lagoon lies near Koraiyar river mouth with small mangrove patches.

Demographics

Muthupet has a population of 39,722. Males constitute 47% of the population and females 53%. Muthupet has an average literacy rate of 71%, higher than the national average of 59.5%: male literacy is 78%, and female literacy is 65%. Islam is the major religion, with an estimated 76.4% of the population being Muslims within the town.

Tamil is the official language and is predominantly spoken. The most commonly used dialect is the Central Tamil dialect.

Culture
White or coloured lungi is widely used as male clothing instead of wearing pants. However, school or college students wear pants. Muslim ladies observe purdah and a significant number of women do wear a niqab.

Like any other Marakkar society, Muthupet is a close-knit community where people generally do not want to have marital relationships outside the town.

Utility services
Electricity supply to Muthupet is regulated and distributed by the Tamil Nadu Electricity Board (TNEB). The city, along with its suburbs, is part of Tiruchirappalli Electricity Distribution Circle.

Muthupet comes under the Thanjavur Telecom circle of the Bharat Sanchar Nigam Limited (BSNL), India's state-owned telecom and internet services provider. Apart from telecom, BSNL also provides broadband internet service.

Economy
Muthupet has two fish markets, Periya Kadai Theru fish market and Azath Nagar fish market. Periya Kadai sells Koduva meen, kalakan meen and viral meen. Muthupet's Azath Nagar fish market is the largest in Thiruvarur district.

Various industries are prominent in Muthupet, including coconut, fishing and aqua farms. The traditional occupation of the local people is fishing.

The Muthupet Bazaar is a busy bazaar that serves the town and its suburban villages.

Politics

Elected ward members 
DMK - 9

SDPI - 4

AIADMK - 3

INC - 1

BJP - 1

Infrastructure
The town houses a government hospital along with several private hospitals/clinics. The Muthupet police station serves the town as well as the surrounding villages. Government establishments like the post office, sub-registrar office, municipality office, village panchayat office, Tamil Nadu Forest Department, customs preventative unit and government library have their base in the town.

Muthupet has four petrol stations that sell petrol, diesel and oil to the public. It also has a good mobile phone network. Mobile network operators such as BSNL, Airtel, Vodafone, MTS, TATA, TATA DOCOMO, Videocon, Jio and Reliance provide their services. In addition, wireless WI-FI connections named Med WI-FI are provided by the Med Group. The town also has a number of internet browsing cafes.

Tourism 
The 700-year-old Islamic shrine Muthupet Dargah of Andavar Sheikh Dawood Khamil Oliyullh was built using traditional architecture. People irrespective of caste, creed and religion visit this holy Dargah. Most visitors are from Kerala and Karnataka, although international visitors attend from Pakistan, Bangladesh, Sri Lanka, Malaysia.

Transport
The town is well connected via road and rail with major towns and cities in Tamil Nadu. The East Coast Road (ECR) from Chennai to Kanyakumari also connects the town. Frequent bus services are available to the nearby town, Pattukkottai, Adirampattinam, Thiruthuraipoondi, Nagapattinam, Mannargudi and Vedaranyam. There are 11 private omnibuses that run daily night services for passengers as well as freight to Chennai in addition to the state-owned TNSTC regular passenger services.

Auto rickshaws act as a major mode of private transportation for short-distance travels. For long travels, local people use private taxis.

Muthupet Railway Station is on the Karaikkudi-Thiruvarur broadguage line. Thiruvarur-Karaikudi-Thiruvarur Demo rail has a daily service except on Sundays. The Ernakulam - Velankanni - Ernakulam express also operates on Sundays but there is no stop at Muthupet railway station. There are no direct trains from Chennai to Muthupet.

Tiruchirapalli airport is the nearest international airport and is located around 110 km from Muthupet.

The town used to be a small seaport during the British period. The old customs building near the coast stands as a landmark site in Muthupet.

By rail

By road

 All are approximate distances.

Education
Muthupet has a number of educational institutions. 
Winners Matriculation School, Alangadu
 Govt Boys Higher Secondary School, Mannai Salai
 Perianayaki Govt Girls Higher Secondary School, Muthupet
மதியழங்காரம் தொடக்கப் பள்ளி Pettai Road, near Arab shahib masjid
 Govt Middle School, Pettai
 Rahmath Girls Matriculation Higher Secondary School, Abdul Kasim Nagar
 Brilliant Matriculation Higher Secondary School, PKT road
 A.N (SANGATH) Primary School, Pettai road
 O.M.A School, O.M.A Garden, Jambavanodai, Melakadu
 Al'Maha Primary School, New Busstand
 KAP Girls Higher Secondary School, Mannai Salai
 New Street Govt Primary School, Old Busstand
 Saraswathi Vidhyalaya Matriculation Higher Secondary School, Ecr-Mannai Salai

References 

Cities and towns in Tiruvarur district